Sharh al-'Aqa'id al-Nasafiyya is a commentary written by the Hanafi-Shafi'i scholar al-Taftazani (d. 791/1389 or 792/1390) on the creed of Najm al-Din 'Umar al-Nasafi (d. 537/1142-3), an authoritative compendium on Islamic Sunni theology that remained a standard textbook in Ottoman schools. The book is a commentary on al-Nasafi's treatise, in which al-Nasafi systematized Hanafi-Maturidi theology. However, al-Taftazani adopted an Ash'ari perspective in his commentary.

'Aqā'id al-Nasafī 
'Aqā'id al-Nasafi, a short summary of the authentic Muslim beliefs by Najm al-Din 'Umar al-Nasafi. 'Aqā'id is the plural of 'aqidah, which means, religious belief, creed, or theology. This short treatise has gained much popularity and acceptance amongst the Islamic community because of its comprehensive summary of the beliefs of Islam.

In this work, Najm al-Din 'Umar al-Nasafi closely followed Abu al-Mu'in al-Nasafi's formulations in his Tabsirat al-Adilla.

Al-Nasafi compiled and enumerated some 60 points of belief, each one of them being established directly or indirectly by a Qur'anic verse or a authentic Hadith. Although written from the perspective of the Maturidi school of theology, there is a consensus about all the fundamental beliefs mentioned in its pages amongst the Sunni scholars and they have only differed on a few of the subsidiary issues dealt with in this work. Many commentaries have been written on this work differing in size; among them are:
 Al-Durra Sharh 'Aqa'id al-Nasafi by Ibn al-Nafis (d. 687/1288).

One of the most popular was the commentary written by Sa'd al-Din al-Taftazani (d. 792/1390). Since then, it has been taught in Islamic schools and seminaries throughout the world, particularly in Central and South Asia.

In 1988, Syed Naquib al-Attas put forward the 'Aqā'id al-Nasafi manuscript as the oldest Malay manuscript with the date of authorship established as 1590 CE (998 AH), during the era of Sultan Alauddin Riayat Syah's rule in Aceh (1589–1604). Like most religious manuscripts in the early stages, this manuscript was a translation from Arabic to Malay and this text was written in both languages, with the translated text written below the lines of the original text in Arabic.

Al-Taftazani's commentary 

Al-Taftazani started the book by praising Ash'aris after criticizing the Mu'tazilis. On various issues like free will, al-Taftazani intervenes as an Ash'ari scholar. Though his commentary in parts reflects an Ash'ari-Maturidi synthesis, the main framework was Ash'ari theology.

Sharḥ 'Aqā'id al-Nasafī by Sa'd al-Dīn al-Taftāzānī is the oldest manuscript copied on the territory of Macedonia. The scribe Muhammad ibn Sinan mentioned that he had copied it in Skopje, in the madrasa (school) of Isa Bey, in 926/1519.

There have been many scholars and theologians who have written glosses and notes on al-Taftazani's commentary, among them are the following:
  (d. 819/1416).
  (d. after 862/1458).
  (d. 885/1480), entitled al-Nukat wa al-Fawa'id 'ala Sharh al-'Aqa'id.
 Hasan Chelebi b. Muhammad Shah al-Fanari (d. 886/1481).
 Ibn al-Ghurs (d. 894/1489). He wrote two commentaries, one long and the other short.
 Muslih al-Din al-Qastallani, better known as al-Kastali (d. 901/1495).
  (d. 905/1499-1500), entitled al-Fara'id fi Hall Sharh al-'Aqa'id.
  (d. 918/1522).
 Shaykh al-Islām Zakariyya al-Ansari (d. 926/1520), entitled .
 Ramadan Efendi (d. 979/1571).
 'Isam al-Din al-Isfarayini (d. 943/1536-7 or 951/1543-4).
 Mulla 'Ali al-Qari (d. 1014/1606).
 Ahmad al-Maqqari (d. 1041/1631), entitled .
 Ibrahim al-Laqqani (d. 1041/1631).
 'Abd al-Hakim al-Siyalkuti (d. 1067/1657).
 Muhammad b. Ahmad b. 'Ali al-Buhuti al-Khalwati al-Hanbali (d. 1088/1678), the student of Mansur al-Buhuti (d. 1051/1641) and also his nephew and son-in-law.
  (d. 1138/1726).
 Sulayman ibn 'Umar al-Jamal (d. 1204/1790).
 Muhammad b. Ahmad b. 'Arafa al-Disūqī (d. 1230/1815).
  (d. 1239/1824).
 Diya' al-Din Khalid al-Baghdadi (d. 1242/1827), the founder of the Khalidi branch of the Naqshbandi order.
 Ibrahim al-Bajuri (d. 1276/1859).
 Hasan b. al-Sayyid 'Abd al-Qadir al-Juri (d. 1322/1909).

The number of glosses (hawashi) on al-Taftazani's commentary on al-Nasafi's creed has reached around 82.

Modern commentators 
 'Abdullah al-Harari (d. 1429/2008).
 .
 .
 Nidal Ibrahim Alah Rashi.

Translations

English 
 A Commentary on the Creed of Islam: Sa'd al-Din al-Taftazani on the Creed of Najm al-Din al-Nasafi, translated with introduction and notes by Earl Edgar Elder, New York: Columbia University Press, and London: Oxford University Press, 1950.

German

Malay

Persian 
 'Aqa'id al-Nasafi, translated into Persian by Muhammad 'Umar Joya.

Russian 
 Толкование акиды «Ан-Насафия» (Шарх ан-насафиййа фи-л-‘акида ал-исламиййа). Книга написана современным иракским ученым, профессором богословия . Translated from Arabic by Adygamov Ramil Kamilovich, Candidate of Historical Sciences, Associate Professor, Senior Researcher of the Department of History of Religion and Social thought, S. Mardzhani Institute of History of Academy of Sciences of the Republic of Tatarstan.

Turkish

Urdu 
 Khulasah Sharh al-'Aqa'id, by Ibn Habib al-Faiz.
 Nazm al-'Aqa'id al-Nasafiyya, by Muhammad Salman Faridi al-Misbahi.
 Kashf al-Fara'id li-hal Sharh al-'Aqa'id: a gloss on al-Taftazani's commentary by Mufti Muhammad Aslam Azizi al-Misbahi.

Gallery

Notes

See also 

 Al-Fiqh al-Akbar
 Al-'Aqida al-Tahawiyya
 Kitab al-Tawhid
 Al-Insaf fima Yajib I'tiqaduh
 A Guide to Conclusive Proofs for the Principles of Belief
 The Moderation in Belief
 Asas al-Taqdis
 List of Sunni books

References

External links 
 Aqīda Nasafiyya — A website dedicated to the study of the work ʿUmar al-Nasafī
 AKĀİDÜ’n-NESEFÎ — İslâm Ansiklopedisi 
 MOTURIDIYLIK TA’LIMOTINING O‘QITILISHI, TARIX VA BUGUNGI KUN — Imam Maturidi International Scientific Research Center 
 Sharh al-'Aqa'id al-Nasafiyya by al-Taftazani on Goodreads
 Sharh al-'Aqa'id al-Nasafiyya by 'Abdullah al-Harari on Goodreads
 Sharh al-'Aqa'id al-Nasafiyya by Abdul-Malik al-Saadi on Goodreads

Sunni literature
Ash'ari literature
Maturidi literature
Islamic theology books
Islamic belief and doctrine
Kalam